is a passenger railway station in located in the city of Yao,  Osaka Prefecture, Japan, operated by the private railway operator Kintetsu Railway.

Lines
Kyūhōjiguchi Station is served by the Osaka Line, and is located 8.3 rail kilometers from the starting point of the line at Ōsaka Uehommachi Station.

Station layout
The station consists of two elevated opposed side platforms with the station building underneath.

Platforms

Adjacent stations

History
Kyūhōjiguchi Station opened on September 30, 1925.

Passenger statistics
In fiscal 2018, the station was used by an average of 5,445 passengers daily.

Surrounding area
Kinki Expressway
 Nagase River

See also
List of railway stations in Japan

References

External links

 Onji Station 

Railway stations in Japan opened in 1925
Railway stations in Osaka Prefecture
Yao, Osaka